Aaron Leya Iseka (born 15 November 1997) is a Belgian professional footballer who plays as a striker for Turkish club Adanaspor on loan from Barnsley.

He made his professional debut at Anderlecht, and also represented Zulte Waregem in the Belgian Pro League. He featured for several years in the French Ligue 1 with Marseille, Toulouse and Metz, and also played second-tier football in England and Turkey.

Club career

Anderlecht
Leya Iseka is a youth exponent from Anderlecht. In the 2013–14 UEFA Youth League, aged 15 in an under-19 tournament, he scored four goals in six games of a group-stage elimination, including a hat-trick on 3 October in a 4–2 home win over Olympiacos. The following season, he scored nine times in seven UEFA Youth League games, second only to Chelsea's Dominic Solanke. This included another hat-trick on 18 March 2015 in a 5–0 home win over Porto in the quarter-finals. That same month, he was given his first professional contract, for five years.

He made his first team debut on 3 December 2014, in a Belgian Cup 7th-round game against K.R.C. Mechelen, replacing Cyriac after 75 minutes in a 4–1 home win. He scored his first goal on 21 January 2015 in the second leg of the quarter-finals, a 4–2 (7–2 aggregate) win over Zulte Waregem. On 22 March he was an unused substitute in the 2015 Belgian Cup Final, a 2–1 loss to Club Brugge at the King Baudouin Stadium. He made nine appearances that season in the Belgian Pro League, the first being on 18 January when he replaced Andy Najar for the last six minutes of a 3–0 win over Lierse S.K. at the Constant Vanden Stock Stadium.

Loans
On 23 July 2016, Leya Iseka joined Marseille in Ligue 1 on a season-long loan, a month after his brother Michy Batshuayi had left the club. However, he returned to Belgium at the start of January 2017 to find a new club he could be loaned out to, after Marseille announced they would not keep him; he was expected to join Mouscron but nothing came of it. He did not score in nine total matches for OM, but did feature and score more frequently for the reserves in CFA (fourth tier).

Leya Iseka was loaned to fellow top-flight team Zulte-Waregem for the season on 21 June 2017. On 22 July, he made his debut in the 2017 Belgian Super Cup, a 2–1 loss to his parent club, replacing Nill De Pauw for the final 11 minutes. He scored his first goal in a professional league on 5 August, a penalty in a 2–0 home win over Sint-Truidense. In the club's UEFA Europa League campaign, he scored twice in five matches, including a late winner in a 3–2 victory over Lazio at the Regenboogstadion.

Toulouse
On 29 June 2018, Iseka returned to Ligue 1, joining Toulouse FC for four seasons. He made his debut on 10 August in the season opener away to his former club Marseille, playing the full 90 minutes of a 4–0 loss at the Stade Vélodrome. Nine days later he scored his first goal for the club to open a 2–1 win over Bordeaux at the Stadium de Toulouse. On 30 September, he was sent off in the first half of a 1–1 draw at Rennes for dissent, and suspended for three matches.

On 29 October 2020, Leya Iseka was loaned to fellow top-flight team Metz for the season.

Barnsley
Iseka signed for EFL Championship club Barnsley on 2 August 2021 on a four-year deal, for an undisclosed fee. He scored three goals in 37 games in his first season, which ended in relegation. Having played only once at the start of the new campaign under manager Michael Duff, who criticised his attitude to training, he joined Adanaspor in the TFF First League on 8 September 2022.

Personal life
Leya Iseka is the younger brother of Belgian international striker Michy Batshuayi, but bears the surname of their mother rather than their father.

Aged 12, he suffered from Osgood–Schlatter disease, which affects the knee in adolescence, and had to take a break from football for several months.

Career statistics

References

External links
 
 

1997 births
Footballers from Brussels
Belgian people of Democratic Republic of the Congo descent
Black Belgian sportspeople
Living people
Belgian footballers
Belgium under-21 international footballers
Association football forwards
R.S.C. Anderlecht players
Olympique de Marseille players
S.V. Zulte Waregem players
Toulouse FC players
FC Metz players
Barnsley F.C. players
Adanaspor footballers
Belgian Pro League players
Ligue 1 players
Championnat National 2 players
Ligue 2 players
English Football League players
TFF First League players
Belgian expatriate footballers
Belgian expatriate sportspeople in France
Expatriate footballers in France
Belgian expatriate sportspeople in England
Expatriate footballers in England
Belgian expatriate sportspeople in Turkey
Expatriate footballers in Turkey